Midnight Sun is the third studio album by the Australian hard rock band The Choirboys, released in 1991.

The music video for "Empire/Our Empire Falls" was directed by Kriv Stenders on 10/10/1989.

Track listing 
"Midnight Sun"
"Our Empire Falls"
"Moon"
"Rise Up"
"Place With No Love"
"Rendezvous"
"Only America"
"Battle Boulevard"
"Going Home (For Cathel)"
"Romance Street"
"We Can Dance"
"We Believed"

The Choirboys (band) albums
1991 albums
Mushroom Records albums